New Amsterdam is an American medical drama television series, based on the book Twelve Patients: Life and Death at Bellevue Hospital by Eric Manheimer, that premiered on September 25, 2018 on NBC and concluded on January 17, 2023, with 89 episodes over five seasons. The series was created by David Schulner and stars Ryan Eggold, Freema Agyeman, Janet Montgomery, Jocko Sims, Anupam Kher, Tyler Labine and Sandra Mae Frank.

Premise
New Amsterdam follows Dr. Max Goodwin as he becomes the medical director of one of the United States' oldest public hospitals, aiming to reform the neglected facility by tearing up its bureaucracy to provide exceptional care to patients.

Cast and characters

Main
 Ryan Eggold as Dr. Maximus "Max" Goodwin, the medical director at New Amsterdam Medical Center
 Freema Agyeman as Dr. Helen Sharpe, Head of the Oncology Department (seasons 1–4; guest season 5)
 Janet Montgomery as Dr. Lauren Bloom, Head of the Emergency Department
 Jocko Sims as Dr. Floyd Reynolds, Head of Cardiothoracic Surgery Division 
 Tyler Labine as Dr. Ignatius "Iggy" Frome, psychiatrist and Head of the Psychiatry Department 
 Anupam Kher as Dr. Vijay Kapoor, former Head of the Neurology Department (seasons 1–3)
 Sandra Mae Frank as Dr. Elizabeth Wilder, a deaf surgeon and the newest Chief of Oncology (season 5; recurring season 4)

Recurring

 Alejandro Hernandez as Casey Acosta, the ED Head Nurse
 Debra Monk as Karen Brantley, the Chairwoman of the Board of Directors
 Megan Byrne as Gladys Miller, Dr. Frome's secretary
 Christine Chang as Dr. Agnes Kao, Head of Neurology who replaced Dr. Vijay Kapoor
 Em Grosland as Kai Brunstetter, an ED nurse
 Shiva Kalaiselvan as Dr. Leyla Shinwari (season 3 – 5)
 Matthew Jeffers as Dr. Mark Walsh, an ED Senior Resident (later, Chief Resident)
 Olivia Khoshatefeh as Dr. Yasmin Turan, an ED Resident 
 Dierdre Friel as Ella (seasons 1–3)
 Stacey Raymond as Kerry Whitaker, a paramedic
 Gemma McIlhenny as Maintenance Crew Janice (seasons 3–4)
 Margot Bingham as Director Evie Garrison (seasons 1–3), the Associate Director of the Legal Department
 Mike Doyle as Dr. Martin McIntyre, Dr. Frome's husband who works as an at-home therapist
 Emma Ramos as Mariana, an ED resident
 Lizzy DeClement as Jemma, psychiatric patient (season 1–2)
 Frances Turner as Dr. Linda "Lyn" Malvo (season 3 – 5), the OB/GYN department head
 Keren Lugo as Dr. Diana Flores, a Attending Physician in Cardiothoracic Surgery
 Zabryna Guevara as Dora Williams, Dr. Goodwin's assistant (seasons 1–3)
 Lisa O'Hare as Georgia Goodwin, Dr. Goodwin's wife (seasons 1–2)
 Michael Basile as Paramedic Moreland 
 Jennifer Betit Yen as Aimee Kamoe, an OR nurse (season 2 – 5)
 Nora & Opal Clow as Luna Goodwin (season 3 – 5)
 Michelle Forbes as Dr. Veronica Fuentes, the "New" Medical Director (season 4)
 Conner Marx as Ben Meyer (season 4 – 5), ASL interpreter who works with Dr. Elizabeth Wilder
 Jackie Roth as Dana Milliner (season 5) ASL teacher
 Marlee Matlin as Dr. Bev Clemons (season 5) guest
 Anna Suzuki as Sandra Fall, a billing associate
 Teresa Patel as Paramedic Harvell
 Nana Mensah as Dr. Camila Candelario (seasons 1–2) 
 Christopher Cassarino as Dr. Edward Nottingham, a Senior Resident (later, Chief Resident) in Cardiothoracic Surgery
 Ana Villafañe as Dr. Valentina Castro (season 2)
 Genevieve Angelson as Dr. Mia Castries (season 4 – 5), the newly appointed Head of the Holistic Medicine Department
 JJ Feild as Dr. Zach Ligon, a physical therapist (season 2)
 Sendhil Ramamurthy as Dr. Akash Panthaki (season 1)
 Ron Rifkin as Dr. Peter Fulton, former dean of the hospital (seasons 1–2)
 Daniel Dae Kim as Dr. Cassian Shin, a trauma surgeon (seasons 2–3)
 Vandit Bhatt as Rohan, Dr. Kapoor's son (seasons 1–2)
 Alison Luff as Alice Healy (season 2)
 Michelle Federer as Millie Tamberlay (seasons 1–3)
 John McGinty as Dr. Liam Sertic (season 3 – 5)
 Gina Gershon as Jeanie Bloom (season 2 – 5)

Episodes

Series overview

Season 1 (2018–19)

Season 2 (2019–20)

Season 3 (2021)

Season 4 (2021–22)

Season 5 (2022–23)

Production

Development
On September 25, 2017, NBC announced that it had given the production, then titled Bellevue, a put pilot commitment. The pilot was written by David Schulner, who was also set to executive produce alongside Peter Horton. Eric Manheimer, the former medical director at New York City's Bellevue Hospital, was expected to serve as a producer. Universal Television was the production company involved with the pilot.

On January 12, 2018, it was reported that NBC had given the production an official pilot order. It was further reported that Horton was expected to direct the pilot episode. On May 4, 2018, it was announced that NBC had given the production a series order. It was also reported that Pico Creek Productions and Mount Moriah Productions would serve as additional production companies. On October 10, 2018, it was announced that NBC had ordered an additional nine episodes of the series, bringing the first season total up to twenty-two episodes. On February 4, 2019, it was announced during the Television Critics Association's annual winter press tour that the series had been renewed for a second season. In January 2020, NBC renewed New Amsterdam for a third, fourth, and fifth season. On March 14, 2022, it was announced that the series would end after its fifth season, which consisted of 13 episodes.

Casting
In February 2018, it was announced that Freema Agyeman, Anupam Kher, Janet Montgomery, and Tyler Labine had been cast in lead roles in the pilot. In March 2018, it was reported that Ryan Eggold and Jocko Sims had also joined the main cast. On September 26, 2018, it was announced that Margot Bingham had joined the cast in a recurring role. On November 6, 2018, it was reported that Sendhil Ramamurthy had been cast in a recurring role. On April 19, 2021, it was reported that Frances Turner had been cast in a recurring role for the third season. In August 2021, it was announced that Michelle Forbes, Sandra Mae Frank, and Chloe Freeman, were cast in recurring roles for the fourth season. In May 2022, Frank was promoted to series regular for the fifth and final season.

Filming
Filming for the series took place at New York City area hospitals including Bellevue Hospital and its surrounding area, Metropolitan Hospital Center, Woodhull Hospital, and Kings County Hospital Center. By October 2018, Universal Television had paid NYC Health + Hospitals, the corporation that oversees New York City's public hospitals,  to film in the hospitals. Robert de Luna, a spokesman for Health + Hospitals, said certain areas that are "unoccupied and unstaffed... presents a great opportunity for a production company and a welcome source of revenue for our health system."

On March 12, 2020, production of New Amsterdam and other Universal Television series was halted due to the COVID-19 pandemic. A supply of personal protective equipment used by the series was donated to the New York State Department of Health.

Release
New Amsterdam premiered on NBC on September 25, 2018 at 10 p.m. The second season premiered on September 24, 2019.

The second season's eighteenth episode, "Our Doors Are Always Open" (originally titled "Pandemic"), that was scheduled to air on April 7, 2020, was shelved by NBC, as its subject matter (dealing with a flu pandemic in New York City) was considered sensitive due to the severity of the COVID-19 pandemic in New York state. Schulner felt that "the world needs a lot less fiction right now, and a lot more facts". The final episode completed before the suspension of production would be designated as the season finale, and aired on April 14. The third season premiered on March 2, 2021. The fourth season premiered on September 21, 2021. The fifth and final season premiered on September 20, 2022. The series finale aired on January 17, 2023.

Marketing
On May 13, 2018, NBC released the first official trailer for the series. On June 22, 2018, a screening of the series was held during SeriesFest, an annual international television festival, at the Denver Art Museum's Lewis I. Sharp Auditorium in Denver, Colorado. The screening was followed by a question-and-answer session with series lead Ryan Eggold and executive producers David Schulner and Peter Horton. It was moderated by Vanity Fairs executive West Coast editor, Krista Smith. On September 10, 2018, the series took part in the 12th Annual PaleyFest Fall Television Previews, which featured a preview screening of the series.

Distribution
In the United Kingdom, the series premiered its first half of Season 1 on Amazon Video on February 8, 2019. Amazon Video releases the series in binge-ready batches, with further episodes released in May 2019 and November 2019.

It was announced on June 1, 2021, that the show was moving from the streaming service to the channel Sky Witness, where it premiered in July 2021.

Reception

Critical response
On the review aggregation website Rotten Tomatoes, the series holds an approval rating of 34% based on reviews from 32 critics, with an average rating of 5.83 out of 10. The website's critical consensus reads, "Overcrowded, overwrought, and overly familiar, New Amsterdam plays more like an exquisite corpse of pre-existing shows than a breakthrough for the genre – though that may be enough for medical drama devotees." On Metacritic, the series has a  weighted average score of 47 out of 100 based on 14 critics, indicating "mixed or average reviews".

Michael Starr of the New York Post wrote: "New Amsterdam will satisfy fans of the genre. It's somewhat predictable, with a moderate dose of prime-time soapiness. But with Eggold's strong performance and an interesting supporting cast, this show could be the right prescription to attract a following."
Robert Lloyd of the Los Angeles Times wrote: "It is as baldly manipulative and corny as heck—the pilot ends with a Coldplay song—and even a little ridiculous. But the actors sell it, and the fact that the action can seem so unlikely oddly just makes it more compelling." Caroline Framke of Variety gave the series a negative review, and was critical of Ryan Eggold in particular: "The problem is that no matter how many side characters and plots the series adds into the mix—and it adds a lot—the doctor who's supposed to be its main catalyst for change is so irritating that he ends up overshadowing the more promising elements."

Ratings

Season 1

Season 2

Season 3

Season 4

Season 5

Home media 

The first season titled "New Amsterdam: Season One" was released in Australia (Region 4) on August 14, 2019. Region 2 (UK) was released on November 19, 2019. The region 2 release is a five-disc set and the Region 4 release is a six-disc set.

The second season was released in Region 1, via Amazon's Manufacture on Demand (MOD) service, on September 1, 2020.

Potential spin-off
In January 2020, NBC Entertainment chairman Paul Telegdy said, "There is a potential for a spinoff. I can imagine a whole world around New Amsterdam." At that time, Nellie Andreeva of Deadline Hollywood added that no conversations were happening, but members of the production were open to the possibility because of the depth of New Amsterdam characters and stories that could be explored with a spin-off.

International version
A Turkish version of the series will premiere in 2022 on Show TV. It will be produced by 03 Medya in association with Universal International Studios.

Notes

References

External links

 
 

 Television shows set in New York (state)
2010s American LGBT-related drama television series
2010s American medical television series
2010s American workplace drama television series
2018 American television series debuts
2020s American LGBT-related drama television series
2020s American medical television series
2020s American workplace drama television series
2023 American television series endings
English-language television shows
NBC original programming
Television productions suspended due to the COVID-19 pandemic
Television series by Universal Television
Television shows based on non-fiction books
Television shows set in New York City